Lawrence Leung's Unbelievable is a six-part Australian television comedy series, starring and primarily written by Melbourne comedian Lawrence Leung and produced by Unbelievable Productions.

In each episode, Leung—a self-confessed sceptic—investigates a type of paranormal phenomenon such as psychics, ghosts, UFOs, magic and psychological manipulation. In the final episode, Leung conducts an elaborate experiment to attempt to turn a sceptic into a believer in the paranormal.

Episodes

References

External links
Official ABC website

2011 Australian television series debuts
2011 Australian television series endings
Australian comedy television series
Paranormal television
Australian Broadcasting Corporation original programming
English-language television shows